is a Japanese voice actress who is represented by Aksent. She is most known for the roles of Yuki Mori (Space Battleship Yamato) and Saeko Nogami (City Hunter).

Asagmi was born in Otaru, Hokkaidō. In 1992, she began to study traditional Japanese storytelling kōdan under the master . By 2004, she had risen to become a star kōdanshi. When she performs as a storyteller, she goes by the art name . Since 2012, even the work of voice actor has started using the name of Ichiryūsai Harumi.

Filmography

Television animation
1970s
Space Battleship Yamato (1974) – Yuki Mori
La Seine no Hoshi (1975) – Michelle
Blocker Gundan 4 Machine Blaster (1976) – Yuka Hōjō
Galaxy Express 999 (1978) – Claire, Kasumi
Majokko Tickle (1978) – Tiko
1980s
The Littl' Bits (1980) – Belfy, or "Lillabit" in the U.S. version
Space Runaway Ideon (1980) – Harulu Ajiba
Urusei Yatsura (1981) – Miki (ep. 39)
Igano Kabamaru (1983) – Kaoru Nonogusa
Sherlock Hound (1984) – Marie Hudson
City Hunter (1987) – Saeko Nogami
City Hunter 2 (1988) – Saeko Nogami
City Hunter 3 (1989) – Saeko Nogami
1990s
City Hunter '91 (1991) – Saeko Nogami
Pretty Soldier Sailor Moon (1992) – Fraw
Thumbelina: A Magical Story (1992) – Mama
Detective Conan (1998) – Yōko Asanuma
Omishi Magical Theater: Risky Safety (1999) – Narrator, Adachi
2000s
PaRappa The Rapper (2001) – Miss Stew (Ep.11)
The Galaxy Railways (2003) – Layla Destiny Shura, Kanna Yuuki
Angel Heart (2005) – Saeko Nogami
Blue Drop (2007) – Shivariel, Blue AI
Koihime Musō (2008) – Shibaki Suikyō
2010s
Star Twinkle PreCure (2019) – Yōko Hoshina

Original video animation (OVA)
Urotsukidoji (1987) - Akemi Ito
Teito Monogatari (1991) – Keiko Mekata
Yamato 2520 (1995) – Amesis
Queen Emeraldas (1998) – Baraluda
Yukikaze (2002) – Rydia Cooley

Films
Space Battleship Yamato (1977) – Yuki Mori
Farewell to Space Battleship Yamato (1978) – Yuki Mori
Galaxy Express 999 series (1979–1981) – Claire, Metalmena
Space Runaway Ideon: A Contact & Be Invoked (1982) – Harulu Ajiba
Final Yamato (1983) – Yuki Mori
City Hunter series (1989–2023) – Saeko Nogami
Doraemon: Nobita's Great Adventure in the South Seas (1998) – Rufin
Okko's Inn (2018) – Mineko

Video games
Ogre Battle: The March of the Black Queen (1996) – Norn
Super Robot Wars Alpha Gaiden (2001) – Machiko Valencia
Super Robot Wars NEO (2009) – Machiko Valencia
Syphon Filter (1999) – Lian Xing

Dubbing
1941 – Betty Douglas (Dianne Kay)
The Amazing Spider-Man – Aunt May (Sally Field)
The Amazing Spider-Man 2 – Aunt May (Sally Field)
The Big Brawl – Nancy (Kristine DeBell)
Cats & Dogs – Mrs. Caroline Brody (Elizabeth Perkins)
Death on the Nile – Mrs. Bowers (Dawn French)
Four Christmases – Marilyn (Mary Steenburgen)
Legally Blonde 2: Red, White & Blonde – Representative Victoria Rudd (Sally Field)
The Man from Hong Kong – Angelica Pearson (Rebecca Gilling)
The Namesake – Ashima Ganguli (Tabu)
Nicky Larson and Cupid's Perfume – Hélène Lamberti (Sophie Mousel)
On Her Majesty's Secret Service (1979 TBS edition) – Olympe (Virginia North)
Police Story 2 – May (Maggie Cheung)
The Reincarnation of Peter Proud – Ann Curtis (Jennifer O'Neill)
West Side Story (1979 TBS edition) – Rosalia (Suzie Kaye)

Accolades
Merit Award at the 16th Seiyu Awards (2022)

References

External links
 
 Harumi no Heya 
 Aksent profile 

1952 births
20th-century Japanese actresses
21st-century Japanese actresses
Japanese voice actresses
Living people
People from Otaru
People from Fujisawa, Kanagawa